The 2017 European Short Track Speed Skating Championships took place from 13–15 January 2017 in Turin, Italy.

Medal summary

Medal table

Men's events

The results of the Championships:

Women's events

The results of the Championships:

Participating nations

See also
Short track speed skating
European Short Track Speed Skating Championships

References

External links
 Official website
Results book

European Short Track Speed Skating Championships
2017 in Italian sport
2017 in short track speed skating
International speed skating competitions hosted by Italy
Sports competitions in Turin
European Short Track